Doi Luang is a 1,694 m high mountain in Thailand, part of the Phi Pan Nam Range.

The mountain rises at the western end of Ban Tun Subdistrict, Mueang Phayao District, Phayao Province, near the point where the limit of this province meets with Lampang Province. With a height of 1,694 metres it is the highest point of the Phi Pan Nam Range.
There are a number of lesser mountains with the name "Doi Luang" throughout the same range.

Its summit is in Doi Luang National Park, less than seven km to the north of Route 120 between Wang Nuea and the AH2 Highway.

See also
Doi Luang National Park
Thai highlands
List of mountains in Thailand

References

External links
Doi Luang National Park
Trekking to Doi Luang (Thai)

Phi Pan Nam Range
Mountains of Thailand
Geography of Phayao province